Jordan Clarke may refer to:

Jordan Clarke (actor) (born 1950), American actor
Jordan Clarke (athlete) (born 1990), American shot putter
Jordan Clarke (basketball) (born 1989), American basketball player, see Club Comunicaciones (Mercedes)
Jordan Clarke (footballer) (born 1991), English footballer

See also
Jordan Clark (disambiguation)